Tomás Yankelevich (born December 12, 1977) is an Argentine television director and television producer. The son of Argentine producer and composer Cris Morena and prolific former Telefe director Gustavo Yankelevich and the brother of actress Romina Yan.

Biography 
Tomás Yankelevich was born in Buenos Aires, Argentina on December 12, 1977. Tomás Yankelevich is the son of actor Gustavo Yankelevich and actress, producer, director and musician Cris Morena. His parents divorced in 1995 when he was eighteen years old. His older sister, actress Romina Yan, died on September 28, 2010 at the Hospital Central de San Isidro, due to a non-traumatic heart attack caused by a aneurysm.

Personal life 
On December 20, 2008, Yankelevich married television actress Sofía Reca. On July 24, 2010, the couple's first child was born, a boy  who they named Inti Yankelevich. On February 12, 2018, the couple's second child was born, a girl who they named Mila Yankelevich.

Career 
Yankelevich debuted as the producer of talents and reality show Popstars: Argentina, which created girl group Bandana. In 2003, Yankelevich directed film Vivir Intentando, his directing debut, which starred Bandana. The film was a box office hit, as well as its following film Erreway: 4 Caminos, which starred popular pop rock band Erreway. 4 Caminos was directed as the spin–off film of the series Rebelde Way, directed by Yankelevich's mother Cris Morena. In 2005, he directed and wrote the Cris Morena Group series Amor Mio, which starred his sister Romina Yan.

In 2011, Yankelevich produced two series, children-oriented show Super Torpe (aired in Disney Channel) with Pablo Martínez and Candela Vetrano, and Cuando me sonreis, a TELEFE primetime show, with Facundo Arana, Mariana Espósito and Benjamín Rojas. Both shows were produced by his production company Utopia and co-produced by his father's company, RGB Entertainment.

In February 2011, Tomás was named the new Telefe director, following the footsteps of his father who led Telefe from 1989 to 1999.

Filmography

References

External links 
 

1977 births
Argentine film directors
Argentine people of Bulgarian-Jewish descent
Argentine people of Italian descent
Argentine film producers
Argentine screenwriters
Male screenwriters
Argentine male writers
Argentine television directors
Living people
Writers from Buenos Aires